Hunlock Creek is an unincorporated community in Hunlock Township, Luzerne County, Pennsylvania, United States. Hunlock Creek has a post office with ZIP code 18621. In 1940, a regional guidebook noted that the town, "its shacks resting in a mountain cleft, is named for the coal-blackened stream that splits it into a number of sections. US 11 parallels the winding river through a long valley that broadens out occasionally to include a cultivated tract on the river flat."

References

Unincorporated communities in Luzerne County, Pennsylvania
Unincorporated communities in Pennsylvania